The origins of the customary units of measurement in South Asia are varied. As in Europe, there were various local systems of everyday measurements of length, mass and dry volume (the latter being a de facto measure of mass for many staple grains), while gold, pearls and gemstones were weighed on a different, slightly more standardized scale. Several of the more important units were cognate with units of measurement in the Arabian Peninsula to the West or in China to the East, to facilitate trade.

During the period of British India, these South Asian units cohabited with imperial units. Some South Asian customary units were redefined in terms of imperial Units by an Ordinance of 1833, and several gained sufficient currency among the colonial population to be listed in the first edition of the Oxford English Dictionary. An early attempt was made at metrication with the Indian Weights and Measures of Capacity Act, 1871, but this had still not been implemented in practice in 1922.

Full metrication with the passage of the Standards of Weights and Measures Act, 1956, now replaced by the Standards of Weights and Measures Act, 1976: these Acts quote the legal conversion factors for imperial units to SI units. Exact conversions can be made for customary units if they had previously been defined in terms of imperial units: however, even when legally defined, the value of a unit could vary between different localities.

Units of length 
 bahar
 bamboo
 girah
 guz
 hat'h
 jow
 sana lamjel
 unglie
 yojana
 Krosha/Kos (also as cosses in English writing)

Units of volume 
 chungah
 maund
 pau
 seer
 ser

Units of area 
 ankanam
 bigha
 cawnie
 cent or decimal
 ground
 guntha
 katha
 kula
 lessa
 marabba

Units of mass 
 adowlie
 bahar
 buddam
 candy
 corgee
 cullingey
 garce
 maund
 masha
 munjandie
 passeree
 ratti
 seer
 tank
 tola

Units of dry volume 
 adowlie
 cullishigay
 garce
 puddee

See also
Indian numbering system
Nepalese customary units of measurement

Further reading

References
 Sizes.com

 
Obsolete units of measurement